Julius Beinortas (11 February 1943 – 13 February 2019) was a Lithuanian politician.  In 1990 he was among those who signed the Act of the Re-Establishment of the State of Lithuania.

References

External links
 Biography

1943 births
2019 deaths
Members of the Seimas
Signatories of the Act of the Re-Establishment of the State of Lithuania